The State Central Library Hyderabad, known as the State Central Library (SCL) earlier known as Asafia Library, is a public library in Hyderabad, Telangana. The building was constructed in 1891. It is one of the most imposing structures in the city and was granted heritage status in 1998 by INTACH, Hyderabad.

The library is located at Afzal Gunj on the bank of the River Musi. It houses 500,000 books and magazines including some rare Palm-leaf manuscripts. This library is the apex of the state's library system.

History
The State Central Library began in 1891 due to the efforts of Syed Hussain Bilgrami, whose personal library formed the institution's initial core.

The library building has an area of 72,247 square yards and was built under the supervision of the architect, Aziz Ali. The foundation was laid in January 1932 by Prince Mir Osman Ali Khan. At the construction's completion, the Asafia Library shifted to the new building in 1936 to mark Nizam VII's Silver jubilee.

In 1941, the Asafia State Library celebrated its Golden Jubilee. When the Hyderabad Public Libraries Act became law in 1955, Asafia State Library was declared as the State Central library for the Hyderabad State.

Collection
The Library has a collection of around five hundred thousand books published since the early 19th century, and Hyderabad Samachara, a monthly newspaper published by HEH Mir Osman Ali Khan, Asaf Jah VII in 1941.

Digitalisation
The first phase of computerisation and networking in libraries through e-Grandhalaya software developed by National Informatics Centre has begun. The project will begin on an experimental basis in Warangal and Hyderabad. Over 40,000 books have already been digitized at SCL with the help of Carnegie Mellon University's Universal Online Library Projects. The digitised works include titles in Hindi, English, Telugu, Urdu and Persian languages. Carnegie Mellon University provides the funding for this project.

See also
 Sri Krishna Devaraya Andhra Bhasha Nilayam

References

External links

 State Central Library at Shehar-e-naaz.com with its majestic picture.
 Department of Public Libraries

1891 establishments in India
Libraries in Hyderabad, India
Heritage structures in Hyderabad, India
Deposit libraries
Libraries established in 1891
Library buildings completed in 1961
Establishments in Hyderabad State
Public libraries in India
20th-century architecture in India